Anna Visigalli (born 24 February 1981) is a retired Italian high jumper.

Career
She won the bronze medal at the 2001 Mediterranean Games. She also competed at the 2005 European Indoor Championships without reaching the final. She became Italian champion in 2002 and 2004 as well as Italian indoor champion 2002 and 2005. Her personal best jump was 1.89 metres, achieved in June 2004 in Pescara. Indoors she managed 1.90 metres, in February 2001 in Ancona.

References

External links
 

1981 births
Living people
Italian female high jumpers
Mediterranean Games medalists in athletics
Mediterranean Games bronze medalists for Italy
Athletes (track and field) at the 2001 Mediterranean Games
Sportspeople from the Province of Lodi
People from Lodi, Lombardy